In Zen Buddhism, the keisaku (Japanese: 警策, Chinese: 香板, xiāng bǎn; kyōsaku in the Soto school) is a flat wooden stick or slat used during periods of meditation to remedy sleepiness or lapses of concentration. This is accomplished through a strike or series of strikes, usually administered on the meditator's back and shoulders in the muscular area between the shoulder and the spine. The keisaku itself is thin and somewhat flexible; strikes with it, though they may cause momentary sting if performed vigorously, are not injurious.

Purpose
The word "keisaku" may be translated as "warning stick", or "awakening stick", and is wielded by the jikijitsu.  "Encouragement stick" is a common translation for "kyōsaku". In Soto Zen, the kyōsaku is always administered at the request of the meditator, by way of bowing one's head and putting the palms together in gassho, and then exposing each shoulder to be struck in turn. The kyōsaku may also be administered as a means of shaming one for sitting in a slouching position. In Rinzai Zen, the stick is requested in the same manner, but may also be used at the discretion of the Ino, the one in charge of the meditation hall. Even in such cases, it is not considered a punishment, but a compassionate means to reinvigorate and awaken the meditator who may be tired from many sessions of zazen, or in the "monkey mind" state (overwhelmed with thoughts).

See also
Jikijitsu
Shippei
Sluggard waker – a similar custom and tool used in 18th century British churches

References

Buddhist ritual implements
Culture articles needing translation from Japanese Wikipedia
Zazen